The AZAL 2010–11 season was AZAL's sixth Azerbaijan Premier League season. AZAL finished the season in 8th place and were knocked out of the 2010–11 Azerbaijan Cup by Inter Baku in the semi-finals. It was their first full season under the management of Nazim Suleymanov.
The team's kit was supplied by Umbro and their sponsor was Silk Way.

Squad

Transfers

Summer

In:

 

Out:

Winter

In:

Out:

Competitions

Azerbaijan Premier League

Results

League table

Azerbaijan Premier League Championship Group

Results

Table

Azerbaijan Cup

Squad statistics

Appearances and goals

|-
|colspan="14"|Players who appeared for AZAL and left on loan during the season:

|-
|colspan="14"|Players who appeared for AZAL and left during the season:

|}

Goal scorers

Disciplinary record

References
Qarabağ have played their home games at the Tofiq Bahramov Stadium since 1993 due to the ongoing situation in Quzanlı.

External links 
 AZAL PFC Official Web Site
 AZAL PFC  at PFL.AZ
 AZAL PFC Official Facebook Page

AZAL PFC seasons
AZAL